Flatness may refer to:
 Flatness (art)
 Flatness (cosmology)
 Flatness (liquids)
 Flatness (manufacturing), a geometrical tolerance required in certain manufacturing situations
 Flatness (mathematics)
 Flatness (systems theory), a property of nonlinear dynamic systems
 Spectral flatness
 Flat intonation
 Flat module in abstract algebra

See also
 Flattening